The Office of the World Bank in London is the diplomatic mission of the World Bank Group in the United Kingdom. It is located in the Millbank Tower, a well-known landmark just south of Westminster.

References

External links

Official site

World Bank
World Bank Group
Buildings and structures in the City of Westminster
Millbank